Cheragh Khan Zahedi (also spelled Cherag), also known as Pirzadeh, was an Iranian officer in Safavid Iran, who served as the head of the royal bodyguard (qurchi-bashi) from 1631 until his death in 1632.

Biography 
Cheragh Khan was the son of a certain Shaikh Sharif and a descendant of Zahed Gilani, the prominent Iranian grandmaster (murshid), and the teacher of Safi-ad-din Ardabili, who was the eponymous ancestor of the Safavid dynasty. Cheragh Khan was a supporter of the family of the qurchi-bashi Isa Khan Safavi, which was a cousin family to the ruling Safavid dynasty. However, in 1632/1633, he accused the sons of Isa Khan Safavi planning to stage a coup against Safi and then usurp the throne. Safi then had them executed, including Isa Khan Safavi himself. Cheragh Khan was then given the qurchi-bashi post as a reward.

However, Cheragh Khan was one year later accused of hiding his empathy for the family of Isa Khan Safavi, and was executed in July 1632. He was succeeded by Amir Khan Zulqadr.

References

Sources 
 
 
 

Safavid generals
Safavid military officers
17th-century Iranian military personnel
Year of birth unknown
1632 deaths
People executed by Safavid Iran
Qurchi-bashi
17th-century people of Safavid Iran